Graptophyllum pictum, the caricature-plant, is a shrub in the family Acanthaceae. It is native to New Guinea, also a well-known garden shrub. There are two varieties: the variegated color one is known as 'white adulsa', and is used combined with coconut water to reduce swelling. The dark-leaved variety is known with trade name 'black adulsa' in India.

Leaf morphology

The shape of the leaf is aristate. The margin of the leaf is undulate. The venation of the leaf is reticulate in the variegated form.

References

pictum